Calkins Peak, is a peak also known as Calkens, O'Calkens Peak, Caulkens Peak, and O'Caulkens Peak. Calkins Peak is directly north of Slide Lake, northwest of Sheep Lake, and southwest of Tin Cup Lake. Calkins Peak is named for Stephen Calkins (1842–1922), a prospector who established lode claims in the area.

References 

Mountains of Custer County, Idaho
Mountains of Idaho
Sawtooth National Forest